The 2022 Houston vs. SMU football game was a regular-season college football game between the Houston Cougars and the SMU Mustangs, played on November 5, 2022 at Gerald J. Ford Stadium in University Park, Texas. The game holds the record for the most combined points scored in an NCAA Division I Football Bowl Subdivision (FBS) regulation game with 140 total points, breaking the previous record (137 points, set in a 2016 game played between Syracuse and Pittsburgh) by three points.

Before the game
This was the 37th meeting between the Cougars and Mustangs, with Houston leading the series 22–13–1. The last meeting between the teams was on October 30, 2021, with the Cougars winning 44–37. In September 2021, it was announced that the Cougars accepted a bid to join the Big 12 Conference along with fellow American members Cincinnati and UCF. The schools had been under contract with The American through 2024, but reached an agreement that will allow them to join the Big 12 in 2023.

Houston

The Houston Cougars, led by fourth-year head coach Dana Holgorsen, entered the game with a record of 5–3, 3–1 in AAC play. The Cougars entered the season ranked no. 24 in the AP's pre-season poll, but dropped to no. 25 after a 37–35 triple overtime victory over UTSA in week 1. The following week, Houston lost to Texas Tech 30–33 in double overtime and dropped out of the rankings as a result. The Cougars would lose again the following week, 30–48 to Kansas, before winning four of their next five, including a 33–32 comeback victory over Memphis.

SMU

The SMU Mustangs, led by first-year head coach Rhett Lashlee, entered the game with a record of 4–4, 2–2 in AAC play. The Mustangs started the season 2–0, but lost their next three games. SMU snapped its losing streak with a 40–34 victory over rival Navy. The Mustangs lost their next game, 27–29, to then no. 21 Cincinnati, then defeated Tulsa 45–34 the following week.

Game summary

Game information

Scoring summary

Game statistics

Team statistics

Game leaders

Analysis
The two teams combined for 1,352 yards of offense, with 907 passing yards while three Houston receivers finished the game with more than 100 receiving yards. SMU quarterback Tanner Mordecai threw for a school-record 9 touchdowns. Additionally, the Mustangs broke the school-record for most points scored in a game, with the previous record being 72.

See also
 2016 Syracuse vs. Pittsburgh football game, the previous record-holder for highest scoring NCAA Division I regulation football game, totaling 137 points.
 2018 LSU vs. Texas A&M football game, the record-holder for highest-scoring game in FBS history, with 146 combined points. The game went to seven overtimes.

References

2022 American Athletic Conference football season
vs. SMU 2022
vs. Houston 2022
2022 in sports in Texas
November 2022 sports events in the United States